Frederick Martin (28 December 1907 – 1978) was an English footballer who played in the Football League for Millwall and Torquay United.

References

1907 births
1978 deaths
English footballers
Association football midfielders
English Football League players
Millwall F.C. players
Torquay United F.C. players